USS R-27 (SS-104) was an R-class coastal and harbor defense submarine built for the United States Navy during World War I.

Description
The R-boats built by Lake Torpedo Boat Company (R-21 through R-27) are sometimes considered a separate class from those of the other builders. They displaced  on the surface and  submerged. The R-class submarines had a crew of 3 officers and 23 enlisted men.

For surface running, the boats were powered by two  diesel engines, each driving one propeller shaft. When submerged each propeller was driven by a  electric motor. They could reach  on the surface and  underwater.

The boats were armed with four 21-inch (53.3 cm) torpedo tubes in the bow. They carried four reloads, for a total of eight torpedoes. The R-class submarines were also armed with a single 3"/50 caliber deck gun.

Construction and career
R-27 was laid down on 16 May 1917 by the Lake Torpedo Boat Company in Bridgeport, Connecticut. 
She was launched on 23 September 1918 sponsored by Mrs. Mary Louise Foster, and commissioned on 3 September 1919. Assigned duty with Submarine Division 1 in the Panama Canal Zone, R-27 got underway for her homeport of Coco Solo on 1 November. She arrived at Coco Solo on 11 December and conducted operations out of that port and out of Balboa.  Given hull classification symbol SS-104 in July 1920, she interrupted her five years in the Canal Zone with an overhaul at Portsmouth, New Hampshire, during the winter of 1921-1922 and a run to Pearl Harbor for exercises in early 1923. On 1 November 1924, she departed Coco Solo for the last time. On 24 November she arrived at Charleston, South Carolina, whence she was towed to Philadelphia, Pennsylvania.  There she was decommissioned on 24 April 1925 after only five-and-a-half years of service. She was berthed at League Island until struck from the Naval Vessel Register on 9 May 1930.  Her hull was sold for scrapping the following July.

Notes

References

External links
 

Ships built in Bridgeport, Connecticut
United States R-class submarines
1918 ships